The lesser prairie chicken (Tympanuchus pallidicinctus) is a species in the grouse family.

Description
It is a medium to large bird, striped white and brown, slightly smaller and paler than its near relative the greater prairie chicken (T. cupido). Adults range from 15.0 to 16.1 in (38-41 cm) in length and 22.1-28.7 oz (628-813 g) in weight.

Distribution
About half of its current population lives in western Kansas, with the other half in the sandhills and prairies of western Oklahoma, the Texas Panhandle including the Llano Estacado, eastern New Mexico, and southeastern Colorado.

Behavior
Like its larger relative, it is known for its lekking behavior.

Conservation
Considered "vulnerable" by the IUCN due to its restricted and patchy range, it is vulnerable to habitat destruction. The lesser prairie chicken's habitat has been reduced by 85%, and their population has declined by as much as 99% in some ecoregions as a result. Of the remaining patches of suitable habitat, only around 0.1% are sufficiently contiguous to sustain even a minimum population of the birds. There is evidence suggesting that global warming may have a particularly detrimental influence by greatly reducing the size of the sagebrush ecosystem. Subfossil remains are known, e.g., from Rocky Arroyo in the Guadalupe Mountains, outside the species' current range but where more habitat existed in the less humid conditions in the outgoing last ice age. Range contraction apparently took place no later than about 8000 BC.

In 2015, Senator Jerry Moran (R-Kan) introduced an amendment to legislation authorizing construction of the Keystone XL Pipeline that would overturn the listing. He disputed the listing as, "... another example of unnecessary intrusion into private lives and businesses by the federal government." His action was supported by the American Energy Alliance and opposed by the League of Conservation Voters.

When the Senate voted on the Keystone bill, it did not get the 60 votes in favor that was required to pass. It got only 53 Republican and one Democratic Senator to vote in favor.

The United States Department of the Interior proposed creating a Lesser Prairie Chicken Preserve as a national monument, but action was never taken action on the proposal.

Threatened and endangered species listings
On March 27, 2014, the lesser prairie chicken was listed as threatened under the Endangered Species Act but the listing was vacated in 2015 following a legal challenge. On June 1, 2021, the US Fish and Wildlife Service proposed splitting the species into two segments. The northern one, covering Oklahoma, Colorado, Kansas, and a portion of Texas, would be listed as threatened, and the southern one, covering New Mexico and a portion of Texas, as endangered. On November 17, 2022, the lesser prairie chicken conservation status was updated to endangered under the Endangered Species Act. The Southern Distinct Population Segments (DPS) of the lesser prairie-chicken of the lesser prairie-chicken lists the species as endangered while the Northern DPS of the lesser prairie-chicken still lists it as threatened.

References

External links 

BirdLife Species Factsheet
Audubon Watchlist - Lesser Prairie Chicken
Lesser Prairie-Chicken videos on the Internet Bird Collection

Grouse
Tympanuchus
Endemic birds of the Plains-Midwest (United States)
Birds described in 1873
Taxa named by Robert Ridgway